= Constituency W-354 =

Provincial constituency of Punjab, Pakistan

W-354
- Woman Reserved constituency for the Provincial Assembly of Punjab

Current constituency

W-354 is a Constituency reserved for women in the Provincial Assembly of Punjab.

== See also ==
- Punjab, Pakistan
